Parski may refer to:

Parski, Kuyavian-Pomeranian Voivodeship, a village in the administrative district of Gmina Grudziądz, Grudziądz County, Poland
Parski, Łódź Voivodeship, a village in the administrative district of Gmina Świnice Warckie, Łęczyca County, Poland

See also
Parsko (disambiguation)